Cymo may refer to: 
 Cymo (crab), a genus of crabs
 Moosonee Airport, Ontario, Canada
 Cymo, one of the Nereids
 Cymo Island, Western Australia